The Landsberger-Gerhardt House, also known as the Fite-Anderson House, is a historic house in Murfreesboro, Tennessee, U.S.. It was built in the Antebellum era for a merchant. It is listed on the National register of Historic Places.

History
The house was built in 1855 by Edwin Arnold, who built many other houses in Murfreesboro in the Antebellum era, for Moses Landsberger, a merchant. It remained in the Landsberger family until 1904.

The house belonged to William Gerhardt from 1907 to 1921, when it was acquired by E. C. Fite. It was inherited by his daughter, Evelyn Fite Anderson.

Architectural significance
The house was designed in the Greek Revival architectural style. It has been listed on the National Register of Historic Places since December 13, 1993.

References

Houses on the National Register of Historic Places in Tennessee
National Register of Historic Places in Rutherford County, Tennessee
Houses completed in 1855
Greek Revival architecture in Tennessee